Ranzovius is a genus of plant bugs in the family Miridae. There are about 10 described species in Ranzovius.

Species
These 10 species belong to the genus Ranzovius:
 Ranzovius agelenopsis Henry, 1984 i c g
 Ranzovius bicolor T. Henry, 1999 c g
 Ranzovius brailovskyi T. Henry, 1999 c g
 Ranzovius californicus (Van Duzee, 1917) i c g b
 Ranzovius clavicornis (Knight, 1927) i c g b
 Ranzovius crinitus Distant, 1893 i c g
 Ranzovius fennahi Carvalho, 1954 c g
 Ranzovius mexicanus (Van Duzee, 1923) c g
 Ranzovius moerens (Reuter, 1905) c g
 Ranzovius stysi T. Henry, 1999 c g
Data sources: i = ITIS, c = Catalogue of Life, g = GBIF, b = Bugguide.net

References

Further reading

External links

Phylini
Articles created by Qbugbot